Harrison County is located in the far southern part of the U.S. state of Indiana along the Ohio River. The county was officially established in 1808. Its county seat is Corydon, the former capital of Indiana.

Harrison County is part of the Louisville-Jefferson County, KY-IN Metropolitan Statistical Area.

The county has a diverse economy with no sector employing more than 13% of the local workforce. Caesars Southern Indiana is the largest employer, followed by Tyson Foods and the Harrison County Hospital. Tourism plays a significant role in the economy and is centered on the county's many historic sites. County government is divided among several bodies including the boards of the county's three school districts, three elected commissioners who exercise legislative and executive powers, an elected county council that controls the county budget, a circuit and superior court, and township trustees in the county's 12 townships. The county has 10 incorporated towns with a total population of over 5,000, as well as many small unincorporated towns. One Interstate highway and one U. S. Route run through the county, as do eight Indiana State Roads and two railroad lines.

Migratory groups of Native Americans inhabited the area for thousands of years, but the first permanent settlements in what would become Harrison County were created by American settlers in the years after the American Revolutionary War. The population grew rapidly during first decade of the 19th century. Corydon was platted in 1808 and became the capital of the Indiana Territory in 1813. Many of the state's early important historic events occurred in the county, including the writing of Indiana's first constitution. Corydon was the state capital until 1825, but in the years afterward remained an important hub for southern Indiana. In 1859 there was a major meteorite strike. In 1863 the Battle of Corydon was fought, the only battle of the American Civil War to occur in Indiana.

History

Humans first entered what would become Indiana near the end of the last ice age. This region was of particular value to the early humans because of the abundance of flint. There is evidence of flint mining in local caves as early as 2000 BCE; the stone was used to produce crude tools. Passing migratory tribes frequented the area which was influenced by succeeding groups of peoples including the Hopewells and Mississippians. One flint-working and camping location is the Swan's Landing Archeological Site, one of the most important Early Archaic archaeological sites in eastern North America. Permanent human settlements in the county began with the arrival of American settlers in the last decade of the 18th century.

The area became part of the United States following its conquest during the American Revolutionary War. Veterans of the revolution received land grants in the eastern part of the county as part of Clark's Grant. Daniel Boone and his brother Squire Boone were early explorers of the county, entering from Kentucky in the 1780s. Harvey Heth, Spier Spencer, and Edward Smith were among the first to settle in the county beginning in the 1790s. Smith built the first home in the area of Corydon.

Harrison County was originally part of Knox County and Clark County but was separated in 1808. It was the first Indiana county formed by the Indiana territorial legislature instead of the Governor, and the fourth to be formed in the future state of Indiana (after Knox and Clark; also Dearborn County was formed in 1803 when the eastern territory borderline with Ohio was adjusted to transfer the "Gore" to Indiana Territory). Portions of the county were later separated into parts of Crawford, Floyd, Washington, Jackson, Clark, Lawrence, Perry, Scott and Orange Counties. The county was named for William Henry Harrison, the first governor of Indiana Territory, a General in War of 1812, hero of Tippecanoe, and the 9th U.S. President. Harrison was the largest land holder in the county at the time and had a small estate at Harrison Spring.

Squire Boone settled in what is now Boone Township in 1806. He died in 1815 and is buried in a cave near his home, Squire Boone Caverns. James, Isaiah, and Daniel (son of Squire) Boone settled in Harrison County's Heth Township during the first decade of the 1800s. The county's first church was built by Boone east of present-day Laconia. The church, which has been reconstructed, is known as Old Goshen. Jacob Kintner settled near Corydon in about 1810. He was one of the wealthiest settlers and amassed a  tract of land around Corydon, built a large home, and maintained an inn. Paul and Susannah Mitchem became Quakers and immigrated to Harrison County from North Carolina in 1814, bringing with them 107 slaves whom they freed after arriving. Although some of the former slaves left, the group became one of the largest communities of free blacks in the state.

The first road was built in Harrison County in 1809 connecting Corydon with Mauckport on the Ohio River. A tow-and-ferry line was operated there by the Mauck family bringing settlers into the county from Kentucky. This road and ferry greatly expanded the county's economic viability and ease of access to the outside world, leading to a rapid settlement of the area. The county's population more than doubled in the following decade.

Dennis Pennington, who lived near Lanesville, became one of the county's early leading citizens and speaker of the territory's legislature. Corydon began competing with other southern Indiana settlements to become the new capital of the territory after its reorganization in 1809. Hostilities broke out in 1811 with the Native American tribes on the frontier, and the territorial capital was moved to Corydon on May 1, 1813, after Pennington suggested that it would be safer than Vincennes. For the next twelve years, Corydon was the political center of the territory and subsequent state. A state constitution was drafted in Corydon during June 1816 and after statehood (December 1816) the town served as the state capital until 1825.

The first division of the county occurred in 1814 when the northern portion of the county was separated to become Washington County. In 1818 the western part of the county was partitioned off to become Crawford County. In 1819 Floyd County was created out of the eastern part of the county. Since that time, Harrison County's eastern border has had minor adjustments through land transactions with Floyd County; the last change occurred in 1968.

The northern part of the county is known as the barrens, named by the early settlers for its scarce timber. At first, settlers preferred the southern areas where wood was available. The barrens were swept by annual wildfires that prevented the growth of trees. The largest barren ran from the northern edge of Corydon northward to Palmyra, and from the Floyd Knobs in the east, westward to the Blue River. The Central Barren covered most of the upper middle part of the county. As settlement expanded and farming grew in the early 19th century, settlers found the barrens to be fertile farmland, and they were quickly settled. As settlement increased, the wildfires were stopped and by the start of the 20th century the uninhabited parts of the barrens had become forested and have remained so until modern times.
A large meteorite fell near Buena Vista on March 28, 1859. The impact site and a part of the meteorite have been preserved.

The first Harrison County fair was held in Corydon in 1860; it has been an annual event since then and is the state's longest continuously running fair. The county fairground was built in Corydon on Edward Smith's former homesite. The original grandstand burned in 1960 and the county purchased a new grandstand from the minor league baseball team at Parkway Field in Louisville, Kentucky.

The only Civil War battle fought in Indiana occurred in Harrison County on July 9, 1863, between the Harrison County Legion and a Confederate group under Brigadier General John Hunt Morgan, during Morgan's Raid. Morgan crossed the Ohio River into Harrison County in the early hours of daylight, resisted by artillery fire from the Indiana shore and an armed river boat. Confederate artillery returned fire from the opposite shore, and the Legion retreated towards Corydon. The citizens of Mauckport fled the town carrying their valuables. Morgan landed on the east side of Mauckport with two thousand cavalry and marched north burning homes, farms, and mills. The county militia made a stand to block his advance on the county seat and the resulting conflict is known as the Battle of Corydon. The battle was won by the Confederates and the town of Corydon was then sacked and stores were looted and ransomed. The battle left 4 dead, 12 wounded, and 355 captured. After the battle, Morgan continued into northern Harrison County where he looted the New Salisbury area with the main body of troops. Crandall and Palmyra were robbed and sacked by detachments. His forces left the county the following day; they were eventually defeated and captured by Union Army forces.

The railroad reached Harrison County in 1869. A line was completed across the northern half of county in 1874 running from Floyd County connecting Crandall and then continuing west into Crawford County. A southward extension connecting Corydon to Crandall was completed in 1882. A train wreck killed three in 1902. The southern extension connecting Corydon was purchased by the Corydon Scenic Railroad Company in 1989. It operated as a tourist attraction until its 2003 closing, which ended passenger service in the county.

The first county courthouse was a small log building. When Corydon became the territory capital in 1813, county and territorial officials shared the building. By 1816 a stone building had been constructed, and it served as both Harrison County Courthouse and the state capital building until the capital was moved in 1825. As more space was needed, other buildings were constructed to supplement the courthouse. In the 1920s, the latest of these office buildings was razed to make way for a new courthouse; the old building was acquired by the State of Indiana and preserved as the first state capitol building. The new courthouse was completed in 1928 at a cost of about $250,000. The building was designed by Fowler and Karges of Evansville and was constructed by J. Fred Beggs and Company of Scottsburg.
The Harrison-Crawford State Forest was started in 1932 when the State of Indiana purchased land in western Harrison County. The  park is the largest state forest in Indiana and surrounds the O'Bannon Woods State Park, as well as the Wyandotte Caves located in eastern Crawford County.

The Matthew E. Welsh Bridge was completed in 1966 in Mauckport, to connect Harrison County with neighboring Meade County in Kentucky. This is the only bridge over the Ohio River between Tell City and New Albany. In 1969 Samuel Hays donated the  Hayswood Nature Reserve to the county. It was developed in 1973 by the Harrison County Park Board by adding public facilities to the western part of the preserve. It is the second largest nature reserve in the county.

Caesars Indiana opened a casino river boat, hotel complex, and golf course in 1998, boosting the county's tourism industry. The casino complex was purchased and became Horseshoe Southern Indiana on July 11, 2008.

Geography

Harrison County is located in the far southern part of Indiana, about halfway between the state's east and west borders. The Ohio River defines the county's southern border; across the river lies the state of Kentucky and the city of Louisville. The Blue River defines most of the county's western border; a straight north–south section of the border exists near the line's midpoint.

The county terrain was heavily forested in its lower half when settlers arrived. At present, a portion is still wooded, with the remainer devoted to agriculture or urban development. The terrain slopes to the south and west, with its highest point ( ASL) on Lagle Ridge,  NE of Depauw.

The western part of the county is drained by the Blue River, flowing southward. The central part is drained by the southwest-flowing Indian Creek, and the lower part of the county is drained by the three forks of Indian Creek. There are only large two bodies of water (other than rivers) within the county's borders, and both are man-made: Lake Coleman is part of Buffalo Trace Park near Palmyra, and the middle fork of Buck Creek has been dammed in Posey Township. There are also smaller bodies, such as the pool at the discharge of Harrison Spring, an abandoned stretch of the Ohio River near the discharge point of Indian Creek, known as "Overflow Pond", and a small pond  ESE of Lanesville.

It rises from a solid rock in a level spot of land, and its flow was sufficient to power flour mills in the past. Is the largest spring by volume in Indiana producing over 3 million gallons (11 million liters) of water daily. The name recognizes William Henry Harrison, who owned this area.

Harrison County is hilly in parts. The Knobstone Escarpment begins in the southeastern part of the county, rises sharply at the Ohio River, and runs along the eastern edge of the county. The "knobs" are the most significant series of hills in Indiana, with the highest knobs near the Ohio River towering  over the surrounding valley. This is the greatest local relief difference in the state.

The western part of the county is preserved as the Harrison-Crawford State Forest and the O'Bannon Woods State Park. The county has extensive cave systems including Squire Boone Caverns, the Binkley Cave System (Indiana Caverns) and smaller, highly decorated caves such as Jewel Box and Devil's Graveyard caves.

Adjacent counties

 Washington County - north
 Floyd County - east
 Hardin County, Kentucky - southeast
 Jefferson County, Kentucky - east
 Meade County, Kentucky - southwest
 Crawford County - west

Towns and incorporated communities

 Corydon (county seat) 
 Crandall
 Elizabeth
 Laconia
 Lanesville
 Mauckport
 Milltown
 New Amsterdam
 New Middletown
 Palmyra

Unincorporated communities

 Bradford
 Breckenridge
 Bridgeport
 Buena Vista
 Byrneville
 Central
 Central Barren
 Corydon Junction
 Davidson
 Depauw
 Dixie
 Dogwood
 Evans Landing
 Fairdale
 Fishtown
 Frenchtown
 Glidas
 Hancock Chapel
 Macedonia
 Moberly
 Mott
 New Boston
 New Salisbury (Census-designated place)
 Ramsey
 Rosewood
 Sugar Grove
 Titus
 Tobacco Landing
 Valley City
 White Cloud

Townships

 Blue River
 Boone
 Franklin
 Harrison
 Heth
 Jackson
 Morgan
 Posey
 Spencer
 Taylor
 Washington
 Webster

Incorporated communities by population

Climate and weather

Harrison County is in the humid subtropical climate region of the United States along with most of Southern Indiana. Its Köppen climate classification is Dfa, meaning that it is cold, has no dry season, and has a hot summer. However, it is close to the southern edge of this region.

Government

The county government is a constitutional body and is granted specific powers by the Constitution of Indiana and by the Indiana Code. Executive and legislative power is vested in the Board of Commissioners, and fiscal power is vested in the County Council.

The seven member county council controls spending and revenue collection in the county. Four representatives are elected from county districts and three are elected at-large. The council members serve four-year terms. They are responsible for setting salaries, the annual budget, and special spending. The council has limited authority to impose local income, property, excise and service taxes. County income and property taxes are subject to state level approval.

The Board of Commissioners consists of three commissioners who are elected county-wide in four–year staggered terms. One commissioner serves as president of the board. The commissioners manage the budget set forth by the council, collect revenue, enact and repeal ordinances, and manage the county government.

Harrison County has a Circuit Court and a Superior Court. The Superior Court handles adult criminal cases, small claims cases, traffic tickets, and infractions. The Circuit Court handles the rest of the cases in the county, including most of the divorce cases, juvenile matters, CHINS cases, civil proceedings, probate, estates, adoptions and civil commitments. Judges in each court serve a six-year term. The Judge of the Circuit Court appoints a referee to handle family law cases.

The county has other elected offices, including sheriff, coroner, auditor, treasurer, recorder, surveyor and circuit court clerk. Each serves a four–year term. Members elected to county government positions are required to declare party affiliations and to be residents of the county.

Each township has a trustee who administers rural fire protection and ambulance service, provides poor relief and manages cemetery care, among other duties. The trustee is assisted in these duties by a three-member township board. The trustees and board members are elected to four-year terms.

Most of Harrison County lies in State House District 70. Blue River Township is part of State House District 73. The entire county is part of State Senate District 47. The county is part of Indiana's 9th congressional district.

Demographics

2020 census

2010 Census
As of the 2010 United States Census, there were 39,364 people, 15,192 households, and 11,031 families in the county. The racial makeup of the county was 97.4% white, 0.5% black or African American, 0.4% Asian, 0.2% American Indian, 0.5% from other races, and 1.0% from two or more races. Those of Hispanic or Latino origin made up 1.5% of the population. In terms of ancestry, 31.1% were German, 16.5% were American, 12.8% were Irish, and 12.8% were English.

Of the 15,192 households, 33.7% had children under the age of 18 living with them, 58.5% were married couples living together, 9.5% had a female householder with no husband present, 27.4% were non-families, and 22.8% of all households were made up of individuals. The average household size was 2.56 and the average family size was 2.99. The median age was 40.2 years.

The median income for a household in the county was $47,697 and the median income for a family was $59,316. Males had a median income of $40,884 versus $31,808 for females. The per capita income for the county was $23,539. About 7.8% of families and 10.0% of the population were below the poverty line, including 15.7% of those under age 18 and 5.1% of those age 65 or over.

Economy

Harrison County has a diverse economy. Manufacturing industry is centered in the Corydon Industrial Park where automobile-related manufacturing is most prevalent. There is large–scale farming throughout the rural areas of the county; corn and soybeans are the county's largest crops. A service and shopping district is centered in Corydon. There are several medical facilities in the county including the Harrison County Hospital, two nursing facilities operated by Kindred Healthcare, and a number of private practices.

The county has a developed tourism industry. The main attractions are the historic sites of Corydon, the county's golf courses, the Horseshoe Riverboat Casino and Hotel, and the area's two famous caves: Squire Boone Caverns near Mauckport and Wyandotte Caves in adjoining Crawford County. The casino is the county's single largest source of tax revenue and produced $23.5 million in tax revenue during 2007.

Multiple utility companies serve the county. Electricity is provided by the Harrison Rural Electric Membership Cooperative (REMC) and Duke Energy. Natural gas is provided by the Indiana Utilities Corporation in Corydon and several small distributors provide rural service. Land-line telephone service is provided exclusively by Verizon. Cable television is provided by Insight Communications in some parts of the county. Water is pumped from a number of corporations, the largest being South Harrison Water Corporation and Ramsey Water Inc.

As of July 2009, the county's largest employer was the Horseshoe Southern Indiana casino with 1,600 employees. Other large employers: Tyson Foods employs 550, Harrison County Hospital employs 504, South Harrison Community School Corporation employs 425, Blue River Services employs 405, Wal-Mart employs 400, North Harrison Community School Corporation employs 311, ICON Metal Forming employs 200, Darmic Inc. employs 120, Kindred Healthcare employs 115, Smith Store Fixtures and Lucas Oil Products each employs 80, Norstam Veneers employs 50, and Speed Flex employs 41. An additional 92 businesses employ 5 to 40 workers. 13% of the workforce is in retail, 12% in government, 12% in manufacturing, 11% in services, 8% in accommodations and food services, 8% in agriculture, 7% in construction, 7% working for local utilities, 6% in finance, insurance, and real estate, and 6% in other trades. The Louisville, Jefferson County, KY-IN Metropolitan statistical area to which Harrison County belongs had an unemployment rate of 10.2% in December 2009.

Transportation

Highways
 Interstate 64 runs east–west through Harrison County, connecting Corydon and Lanesville.
 US Route 150 crosses the northern part of the county following the route of the Buffalo Trace.
 State Road 135 runs north–south through the county.
 State Road 62 runs east–west through the county, crossing State Road 135 at Corydon.
 State Road 64 runs east–west across northern Harrison County. It crosses State Road 135 in New Salisbury.
 State Road 111 connects Elizabeth with New Albany in neighboring Floyd County; the Horseshoe Riverboat Casino is located on the route.
 State Road 337 runs northwest–southeast across the county, passing through Corydon.

Railroads
 Lucas Oil Rail Line m– a  shortline railroad from Corydon northward through the industrial park where Lucas Oil's bottling facilities are located, to its intersection with east–west Norfolk Southern Railway line near New Salisbury.
 Norfolk Southern line - crosses northern Harrison County, through Crandall, Ramsey, and Depauw. It has a small depot in Ramsey.

Airport
There is one airport in Harrison County, a general-aviation (gravel east–west strip) port  NNW of Elizabeth: Robinson Airpark.

Education
The county has 22 schools; 15 are public schools in 3 school districts, and 7 are private. South Harrison Community Schools is the largest district with 3,141 pupils in 2010. The district covers the southern half of the county and includes Corydon Central High School, Corydon Central Junior High School, South Central Junior & Senior High School, Corydon Intermediate, Corydon Elementary, Heth-Washington Elementary, and New Middletown Elementary. North Harrison Community School Corporation had 2,324 pupils in 2010 enrolled in North Harrison High School, North Harrison Middle School, North Harrison Elementary, and Morgan Elementary. Lanesville Community School Corporation is the smallest district serving only Franklin Township. It consists of Lanesville Junior Senior High School and Lanesville Elementary. In 2010, teachers in the North Harrison district averaged $50,800 in annual salary; South Harrison teachers averaged $48,500; Lanesville teachers averaged $51,500. North Harrison had a 2010 graduation rate of 81.5%; South Harrison 84.6%; Lanesville 91.5%. Lanesville and North Harrison students performed above average on 2010 statewide ISTEP+ tests, while South Harrison students performed below average.

The county has several private schools supported by local churches. St. John's, a Lutheran school near Lanesville, has 77 pupils. St. Joseph's, a Catholic school in Corydon, has 87 pupils. County high school students, including those in public, private, and home schools, may attend the vocational school C. A. Prosser school of Technology in neighboring Floyd County as part of their high school curriculum.

The 2017 Lanesville Eagles’ baseball program captured the school's first state title in any sport and the first state crown in Harrison County history by way of a 5–1 win over Rossville in the Class 1A final at Victory Field in Indianapolis.

The county is served by the Harrison County Public Library system. All county residents have free access.

Notable people

William Taylor Zenor - born in 1846 near Corydon. Practiced law in Corydon and Leavenworth. Judge, third judicial circuit (1885–1897). Indiana representative in US House of Representatives (1897 - 1907). Buried in Corydon.

James Best – born in 1926 in Kentucky; at the age of three he went to an orphanage, then was adopted and was raised in Corydon. After his Army service he became a movie and television actor. Best known as Sheriff Rosco P. Coltrane on The Dukes of Hazzard.

Arville Funk - born in Harrison County in 1929 and attended school in Corydon. He taught high school history for 10 years starting in 1955. Practiced law in Corydon. He was active with Indiana historical and genealogical societies, and wrote about Indiana history. He is buried in Corydon.

Frank O'Bannon – born in 1930 in Corydon. After an Air Force stint he was state senator, lieutenant governor, and then governor (1997–2003). Buried in Corydon.

See also
 National Register of Historic Places listings in Harrison County, Indiana

Notes

References

Further reading

External links

 Official Harrison County Website
 Harrison County Tourism Website
 Registered Harrison County Historic Sites
 Indiana Department of Education, Harrison County Schools
 Watchful Eye of Harrison County

 
Indiana counties
1808 establishments in Indiana Territory
Populated places established in 1808
Indiana counties on the Ohio River
Louisville metropolitan area